Boajibu is a town in Kenema District, in the Eastern Province of Sierra Leone. It is the Chiefdom Headquarters of the Simbaru Chiefdom. The current Paramount Chief of Simbaru Chiefdom is P.C Madam Mamie G. Gamanga.
The present population of Boajibu is about 7384 according to the 2004 Population and Housing Census of Sierra Leone.

References

 http://awoko.org/index.php?mact=News,cntnt01,detail,0&cntnt01articleid=5762&cntnt01returnid=950

Populated places in Sierra Leone